The Constitution of 1961 may refer to the

Turkish Constitution of 1961
South African Constitution of 1961